The 1970 Texas Longhorns baseball team represented the University of Texas at Austin in the 1970 NCAA University Division baseball season. The Longhorns played their home games at Clark Field. The team was coached by Cliff Gustafson in his 3rd season at Texas.

Personnel

Roster

Schedule and results

Notes

Perfect Game
On April 3, 1970 James Street shutout Texas Tech 4–0 over 7 innings in Lubbock, TX to secure the first and only Perfect game in Longhorn's history. This was also the only perfect game in the history of the Southwest Conference.

References

Texas Longhorns baseball seasons
Texas Longhorns
Southwest Conference baseball champion seasons
College World Series seasons
Texas Longhorns